Smash is a Norwegian chocolate snack produced by Nidar. It consists of salted corn cones covered by milk chocolate, producing a salt and sweet, light and crisp combination. It is available in one flavour, in four sizes: a small bag of 100 grams, a large bag of 200 grams, a chocolate bar of 40 grams, a chocolate bar of 160 grams, and in 2012, an extra large bag of 345 grams.

See also
 Bugles (snack)

External links
 Product page at Nidar.com
  

Brand name chocolate
Norwegian confectionery